KHYT is a commercial radio station located in Tucson, Arizona, United States, broadcasting on 107.5 FM.  KHYT airs a classic hits music format branded as "K-Hit 107.5".  Its studios are located north of downtown Tucson, and the transmitter is at Tower Peak in Tucson Mountains.

History
KHYT was first assigned the AM frequency of 1330 kHz in the late 1960s as a daytime-only station to serve Tucson. In 1980 then owner Robert H. Scholz moved the city of license to the city of South Tucson in order to go 24 hours a day. After the sale of the station in the mid-eighties the call letters were dropped, allowing another station to pick up the calls in 1995.

KCUB originally went on the air on the 107.5 frequency in 1993. It was called K-Cub and played new and old country hits. K-Cub was eventually moved to 1290 AM.

In 1995, the (current) station changed its call letters to become KHYT and flipped formats to classic rock hits. It used the name K-Hit 107.5.

In 2004, the name was changed to Rock 107.5, but the playlist and format stayed the same.

Recently the name has been changed back to "K-Hit 107.5" with a classic hits format, however it uses the same logo scheme.

Programs
KHYT is the only FM radio station in Tucson that airs sports games. They support and air the Arizona Wildcats basketball and football games live in FM stereo in the appropriate seasons.

See also
 List of radio stations in Arizona

External links
 K-Hit 107.5 official website

HYT
Cumulus Media radio stations
Classic hits radio stations in the United States
Radio stations established in 1993
1993 establishments in Arizona